Preziosa may refer to:

529 Preziosa, a star
The daughter in the story The She-bear
MSC Preziosa, a cruise ship